Cabalum, family name from Leon, Iloilo and its equivalent in various languages stem, refers to:
Cheval, [L cabalum horse] m  1. horse; 2. fam. pej. tall and slim woman or girl.  See femme, fille French 
cabalum linguae anglicae de enochiana particulari per De Collectanarum Heptarchia Mystica et Liber Scientia Auxilii Et Victoria Terrestis 
A cabal is a group of people united in some design, often secretively.
A surname, as in Jose Cabalum Sr.
Cabalum Western College